A Party Political Broadcast on Behalf of the Emotional Party is the title of Ian McNabb's 4th solo album after leaving The Icicle Works. The album peaked at No. 162 on the official UK charts.

Track listing
All tracks composed by Ian McNabb
 "Sex with Someone You Love" [5:12]
 "A Guy Like Me (And a Girl Like You)" [5:10]
 "Loveless Age" [4:59]
 "You Only Get What You Deserve" [5:01]
 "Bloom" [5:01]
 "The Man Who Can Make a Woman Laugh" [4:26]
 "Liverpool Girl" [4:31]
 "Absolutely Wrong" [4:06]
 "Little Princess" [5:55]
 "Girls Are Birds" [2:36]

Personnel
Ian McNabb - acoustic guitar, mellotron, grand piano, shaker, tambourine, harp, vocals
Mike Scott - acoustic guitar, tambourine, backing vocals on "Loveless Age" and "You Only Get What You Deserve"
Danny Thompson - double bass on "Sex with Someone You Love", "Bloom", "Liverpool Girl" and "Little Princess"
Anthony Thistlethwaite - mandolin, tenor saxophone, backing vocals on "Loveless Age", "Liverpool Girl" and "Little Princess"

References

1998 albums
Ian McNabb albums